Desert Blossoms is a 1921 American silent drama film directed by Arthur Rosson and starring William Russell, Helen Ferguson and Wilbur Higby.

Cast
William Russell as Stephen Brent
Helen Ferguson as Mary Ralston
Wilbur Higby as James Thornton
Willis Robards as Henry Ralston
Margaret Mann as Mrs. Thornton
Dulcie Cooper as Lucy Thornton
Charles Spere as Bert Thornton
Gerald Pring as Mr. Joyce

References

External links

1921 drama films
1920s English-language films
American silent feature films
Silent American drama films
American black-and-white films
Fox Film films
Films directed by Arthur Rosson
1920s American films